Margaret Ollerenshaw (born 8 October 1949) is an English actress. She is known for portraying the role of Mavis in the BBC sitcom Open All Hours (1981–1982) and its sequel Still Open All Hours (2013–2019). Her other television credits include First of the Summer Wine (1988–1989), The House of Eliott (1992) and Lovejoy (1993–1994).

Early life
Ollerenshaw was born on 8 October 1949 in Ashton-on-Ribble, Preston, Lancashire, England to Joseph and Margaret Ollerenshaw (née Daly).

Career
Ollerenshaw portrayed Mrs. Violet Clegg in the short-lived series First of the Summer Wine, and became a more familiar television face after starring in The House of Eliott as Florence Ranby, a dour Victorian and head of the Eliott workroom, who died in a tragic road accident outside the Eliott's fashion house. The actress also featured as Martha in the Andrew Davies adaptation of Trollope's classic He Knew He Was Right.

Her many other television credits include roles in Lovejoy, Coronation Street, Juliet Bravo, Last of The Summer Wine, Heartbeat, Holby City, One Foot In The Grave, Seaview, Teachers, Victoria Wood - As Seen On TV, The Hunt For The Yorkshire Ripper, Midsomer Murders and Wire In The Blood. Her film credits include Britannia Hospital, A Private Function, Pierrepoint and Steven Spielberg's War Horse.

Her one-woman show Yours Sincerely, a musical play about Dame Vera Lynn has played in the UK and abroad. She also starred in the play Screamers at the Warehouse Theatre.

Since 2014, Ollerenshaw has provided the voice of Henrietta (UK/US) in the British animated television series Thomas & Friends. She also voiced the role of The Queen in Little Princess. In 2019, she was in the television show Scarborough as Geraldine, the owner of a hair salon.

Personal life
Ollerenshaw married Jack Ainscough in 1969 but the marriage ended in divorce. In 2007, she married fellow actor Geoffrey Leesley.

Filmography

Film

Television

References

External links
 

1949 births
Living people
20th-century English actresses
21st-century English actresses
English film actresses
English stage actresses
English television actresses
English voice actresses
Actors from Preston, Lancashire